The Hungarian Space Research Office (HSO) is the official Government of Hungary agency responsible for the civilian space program as well as aeronautics and aerospace research. It is the organization whose purpose is to coordinate Hungarian space exploration-related activities, both national programs and European Space Agency related programs, where Hungary is a member state.

The Hungarian Space Board (HSB), headed by Dr. Kálmán Kovács (former Minister for Informatics and Communications), helps the work of the Government in strategic cases. The government advisory body in technical matters is the Scientific Council on Space Research (SCSR). The SCSR provides the scientific background of all Hungarian space activities. The research and application activities have been carried out in about 25 scientific institutes and university departments. Their personnel, involved in space-related work consists of more than 250 scientists and engineers. The Hungarian government established it in January 1992. The former director is Előd Both (1997-2015), the present director is Fruzsina Tari.

See also
 List of government space agencies

External links
Hungarian Space Office
European Space Agency
 

Space agencies
Science and technology in Hungary
Space program of Hungary
Government agencies established in 1992
Science and technology in Europe
1992 establishments in Hungary